Messing-cum-Inworth is a civil parish in north-east Essex, 8.5 miles west of Colchester, and 15 miles east of Chelmsford. The parish consists of two small villages; Messing (population 250), and Inworth (population 100). At the 2011 the population of the Civil Parish was 363.

Geography
The parish of Messing-cum-Inworth is bounded by the parishes of Kelvedon to the west, Feering to the north, Birch to the east and Tiptree to the south.  The highest point in the parish is no more than 69 metres (226 ft) above sea level dropping to 32 metres (105 ft) in the vicinity of Domsey Brook. It is situated in the Birch & Winstree ward of Colchester Borough Council.  Amenities in Messing include Messing Primary School, a church, a pub/restaurant, and a large garden centre, while Inworth hosts most of the small businesses in the parish.

History
The parish was created on 1 April 1934 from the parish of Inworth and part of Messing.

Notable residents
John Haynes – First Governor of Connecticut, 1639-54
 Reynald Bush (1593-1670) – Patrilineal ancestor of George H. W. Bush and George W. Bush; the last such ancestor to be born in England

References

External links

Civil parishes in Essex
Borough of Colchester